Rustic Hills is an unincorporated community in Ohio Township, Warrick County, in the U.S. state of Indiana.

Geography

References

Unincorporated communities in Warrick County, Indiana
Unincorporated communities in Indiana